Colby Edmund "Babe" Slater (April 30, 1896 – January 30, 1965) was an American rugby union player who captained the United States national rugby union team that won the gold medal at the 1924 Summer Olympics. He was a member of the American rugby union team, which won the gold medal in 1920 and 1924.

Biography
Colby Slater was born on April 30, 1896, in Berkeley, California, the son and youngest of four children of John Slater and Louise Slater (born Chenery). With his older brother, Norman, Slater attended Berkeley High School and played for the school's rugby team in 1912 and 1913, winning a state championship in 1912. In 1914, Slater enrolled at the University Farm School in Davis, California. (The University Farm School was then a branch of the College of Agriculture at the University of California, Berkeley and is considered a precursor to the University of California, Davis, which claims him as an alumnus.) Slater graduated from the University Farm School in May 1917, and enlisted in the United States Army shortly thereafter. He served with the Medical Corps in France during World War I. In 1919, Slater returned to California and began his career as a farmer. In 2011, Slater was inducted twice into the U.S. Rugby Hall of Fame, as a member of both the 1920 and 1924 national teams. In 2012, Slater was again inducted into the U.S. Rugby Hall of Fame, but this time as an individual player.

References

External links

profile
Colby E. “Babe” Slater Papers at Special Collections Dept., University Library, University of California, Davis

1896 births
1965 deaths
University of California, Davis alumni
American rugby union players
Rugby union players at the 1924 Summer Olympics
Olympic gold medalists for the United States in rugby
United States international rugby union players
Medalists at the 1924 Summer Olympics
Medalists at the 1920 Summer Olympics
United States Army personnel of World War I
Farmers from California